There are 42 named tributaries of Larrys Creek, which is a 22.9 mile (36.9 km) long stream in Lycoming County in the U.S. state of Pennsylvania. Larrys Creek is a tributary of the West Branch Susquehanna River and part of the Chesapeake Bay drainage basin; its watershed drains  in six townships and a borough. Despite being clear-cut in the 19th century, as of 2008 the Larrys Creek watershed is 83.1% forest and 15.7% agricultural.

The named tributaries within the watershed are presented here in three lists. Larrys Creek itself has 18 named tributaries, which are the subject of the first list. The First Fork and Second Fork of Larrys Creek are the two main tributaries of Larrys Creek, and they have multiple tributaries of their own. The second list gives the First Fork's eight named tributaries, and the third list gives the Second Fork's nine named tributaries. Finally there are seven named streams in the watershed which are tributaries of tributaries of the three main branches, and they are presented after each list. There is one such stream for Larrys Creek itself, two for the First Fork, and four for the Second Fork. There are also tributaries without names, which are not included in these lists.

Each list follows the same format. The first column gives the name—27 of the tributaries are named streams, while the remaining 15 are unnamed streams in named valleys: i.e. 13 hollows, one cove, and one swale. Tributaries which are themselves unnamed, but which are in a named valley are given the name of the feature in quotation marks, for example: "Pond Hollow". The first column also notes whether the tributary enters its parent stream on the right bank or left bank. The second column in each list gives the river miles, which is the distance from the mouth of the tributary to the mouth of its parent stream (Larrys Creek or the First or Second Fork). The third column gives the area of the drainage basin or watershed for that stream. The next four columns give the latitude and longitude and the elevation of the mouth and source of each tributary, and the final column has remarks, mostly about location.

Tributaries
Larrys Creek flows south from the dissected Allegheny Plateau to the Ridge-and-valley Appalachians. It rises in Cogan House Township and flows south to Green Mountain. There it turns southwest and flows under the Cogan House Covered Bridge, which is on the National Register of Historic Places and one of only three remaining covered bridges in Lycoming County. At Buckhorn Mountain it turns south through Pennsylvania State Game Lands (SGL) No. 114 and flows through Mifflin and Anthony Townships, passing between Coal Mountain and Harris Point. From Mifflin Township it enters the borough of Salladasburg, where it receives the Second Fork, and just south of the borough the First Fork joins the creek. These two largest tributaries drain parts of Pine, Cogan House, Cummings, and Mifflin Townships (there are named streams in the Larrys Creek watershed in all but Pine Township). Piatt Township is the last municipality the creek flows through and it enters the West Branch Susquehanna River there.

The five largest direct tributaries in the Larrys Creek watershed are the First and Second Forks of Larrys Creek, Roaring Run, Wendell Run and Wolf Run. Roaring Run accounts for 5.7% of the total watershed (5.1 square miles or 13.2 km2) and other tributaries are less than 5% of the total area.

Main stem tributaries

Wendell Run, itself a tributary of Larrys Creek, has one named tributary: Buck Run.

First Fork tributaries
The First Fork is the second largest tributary and has its source in Cummings Township. It flows south-southeast passing to the southwest of Little Round Top and Puterbaugh Mountain, then leaves the dissected Allegheny Plateau at Fishery Point. It then enters Mifflin Township, where it joins Larrys Creek just south of Salladasburg, 4.2 miles (6.8 km) from the mouth. Historically, much of the First Fork was protected as part of the Ogontz Lodge, a private hunting and fishing club.

All other tributaries are less than 5% of the total area.

There are two named tributaries of the First Fork which have their own named tributary: Tarkiln Run has Ritter Run; and Dog Run has Little Dog Run.

Second Fork tributaries
The Second Fork is the largest tributary and rises in Cogan House Township near the village of White Pine. It runs south through the village of Brookside, then along the east side of Henson Ridge and Puterbaugh Mountain through Cummings and Mifflin Townships. It leaves the dissected Allegheny Plateau at Clapp Point and ends in Salladasburg, where it joins Larrys Creek 5.8 miles (9.3 km) from the mouth. In 1851 a plank road was built from the mouth along Larrys Creek to Salladasburg, then followed the Second Fork as far as the village of English Centre in Pine Township. There was also a spur along the First Fork into Anthony Township and perhaps further. An 1889 flood destroyed much of the plank road, and it ceased operation as a toll road in 1900. Today Pennsylvania Route 287 follows its course along the entire length of the Second Fork. Over  along it belongs to the private "Larrys Creek Fish and Game Club".

All other tributaries are less than 5% of the total area.

There are four named tributaries of the Second Fork which have their own named tributaries: Funston Run is formed by the confluence of Right Fork Funston Run with Left Fork Funston Run; Little Harbor Run has "Little Sandy Hollow"; and Lawshe Run has "Bear Hollow".

See also
 List of rivers of Pennsylvania

Notes

a. The First Fork of Larrys Creek has eight named tributaries and is the subject of the second list.
b. The Second Fork of Larrys Creek has nine named tributaries and is the subject of the third list.
c. This stream has at least one named tributary of its own. See the small table directly after this list for details.

References

External links

 
 
 

Lists of coordinates
Larrys Creek

Larrys Creek